WLQC (103.1 FM) is a radio station broadcasting an adult standards/MOR format, licensed to Sharpsburg, North Carolina. It airs the same programming as WLHC, Robbins, North Carolina.

References

External links

LQC
Radio stations established in 2010